Martin Edward "Marty" McCormick (born June 19, 1964 in Cleveland) is an American slalom canoeist who competed from the mid-1980s to the mid-1990s. He finished 15th in the C2 event at the 1992 Summer Olympics in Barcelona.

He started off his career as a K1 paddler, but later started competing in C2 together with Elliot Weintrob.

World Cup individual podiums

References

Sports-Reference.com profile

1964 births
American male canoeists
Canoeists at the 1992 Summer Olympics
Living people
Olympic canoeists of the United States
Sportspeople from Cleveland